The International Paneuropean Union, also referred to as the Pan-European Movement and the Pan-Europa Movement, is the oldest European unification movement. 
It began with the publishing of Count Richard von Coudenhove-Kalergi's manifesto Paneuropa (1923), which presented the idea of a unified European State. The Union's General Secretariat is located in Munich, but it has branches in many European countries.

The President of the Union since 2004 is Alain Terrenoire, former Member of Parliament in France and MEP and Director of the French Paneuropa-Union. Otto Habsburg became the International Honorary President of the International Paneuropean Union in 2004. Its Vice President is Walburga Habsburg Douglas, a member of the Swedish Parliament.

Members
As of January 2023, the Paneuropean Union consists of member organizations in 30 countries across Europe:

 Albania
 Andorra
 Austria
 Belgium
 Bosnia and Herzegovina
 Bulgaria
 Croatia
 Czech Republic
 Estonia
 Finland
 France
 Germany
 Hungary
 Italy
 Kosovo
 Latvia
 Luxembourg
 Montenegro
 North Macedonia
 Poland
 Portugal
 Romania
 San Marino
 Serbia
 Slovakia
 Slovenia
 Spain
 Sweden
 Switzerland
 Ukraine

History

Coudenhove-Kalergi, a member of the Bohemian Coudenhove-Kalergi family and the son of an Austro-Hungarian diplomat and a Japanese mother, was the organisation's central figure and President until his death in 1972. The organisation was prohibited by Nazi Germany in 1933, and was founded again after the Second World War. Winston Churchill lauded the movement's work for a unified Europe prior to the war in his famous Zurich speech in 1946. The French branch was founded by Georges Pompidou and Louis Terrenoire, subsequently French President and Minister for Information respectively, with the support of Charles de Gaulle. Otto von Habsburg, the head of the Habsburg dynasty and former Crown Prince of Austria-Hungary, became involved with the Paneuropean Union in the 1930s, was elected its Vice President in 1957 and became its International President in 1973, after Coudenhove's death. 

The organisation was much reviled by the communist regimes of the Eastern Bloc. The organisation became renowned for its role in organising the Pan-European Picnic, an important event during the Revolutions of 1989.

Presidents

Members
The Paneuropean Union lists the following as historical members:

 Konrad Adenauer
 Raymond Barre
 Léon Blum
 Aristide Briand
 Paul Claudel
 Benedetto Croce
 Albert Einstein
 Sigmund Freud
 Charles de Gaulle
 Alfons Goppel
 Otto von Habsburg
 Gerhart Hauptmann
 Bronisław Huberman
 Bruno Kreisky
 Paul Löbe
 Salvador de Madariaga
 Heinrich Mann
 Thomas Mann
 Johan Ludwig Mowinckel
 Fridtjof Nansen
 José Ortega y Gasset
 Georges Pompidou
 Rainer Maria Rilke
 Arthur Schnitzler  
 Kurt Schuschnigg
 Franz Josef Strauß
 Richard Strauss
 Gustav Stresemann
 Paul Valéry
 Franz Werfel
 Stefan Zweig

See also 
 Pan-European identity
 European integration – mainly through the European Union and the Council of Europe
 Euroscepticism – opposition to the process of political European integration

References

External links

 
 European Society Coudenhove-Kalergi
 Archival sources on the Paneuropean Union at the Historical Archives of the EU 
 Pan-Europa by Richard N. Coudenhove-Kalergi

Eurofederalism
Cross-European advocacy groups
Organizations established in 1923
Organisations based in Munich
Pan-Europeanism
Richard von Coudenhove-Kalergi